Wynberg St Johns are a South African football club.

Former Welsh international Pat Van Den Hauwe played for the club.

Honours

 National First Division (Coastal Stream): 1997/1998 Third Place

References 

Soccer clubs in Cape Town
Defunct soccer clubs in South Africa